"Primer día" (English "First Day") is a song by American singer Julieta Venegas and Argentinean rapper Dante Spinetta, which was the fourth single from the album Limón y Sal.

Song information 

The song was written for Julieta Venegas and Dante Spinetta and produced by Cachorro López.  The song is about two people who have finished already but for the first time will say what you feel after having finished their relationship.

Video music 

The video was shot in a city in Argentina, the director was Joaquín Cambre.

The video shows Dante Spinetta walking down the city with a typical fruit vendor attire, pushing a kart loaded with watermelon, while Julieta, dressed in Asian motifs, tours the city in the back seat of a taxi. The two meet by chance when the taxi accidentally cuts Dante's way abruptly and the fruit splatters on the street.

The audience is then shown a series of still takes and animations of Julieta dressed as a stereotypical ninja fighting with a sword, while Spinetta raps in front of typical ninja-movie imagery. After a little singing in the cab, another set of stills and animations with the singers dressed up in a more modern style with slot machine and other casino imagery in the background. Then Julieta sings in the taxi a little more.

After that, both styles of the previous animations are shown. Then Venegas and Spinetta are seen walking through a street market, singing the rest of the song.

Tracking list
CD Single
"Primer Día" featuring Dante Spinetta — 3:56

Chart

Weekly charts

References

Julieta Venegas songs
2007 songs
Songs written by Julieta Venegas